The environmental movement (sometimes referred to as the ecology movement), also including conservation and green politics, is a diverse philosophical, social, and political movement for addressing environmental issues. Environmentalists advocate the just and sustainable management of resources and stewardship of the environment through changes in public policy and individual behaviour. In its recognition of humanity as a participant in (not enemy of) ecosystems, the movement is centered on ecology, health, and human rights.

The environmental movement is an international movement, represented by a range of organizations, from enterprises to grassroots and varies from country to country. Due to its large membership, varying and strong beliefs, and occasionally speculative nature, the environmental movement is not always united in its goals. The movement also encompasses some other movements with a more specific focus, such as the climate movement. At its broadest, the movement includes private citizens, professionals, religious devotees, politicians, scientists, nonprofit organizations, and individual advocates.

History

Early awareness
Early interest in the environment was a feature of the Romantic movement in the early 19th century. The poet William Wordsworth had travelled extensively in England's Lake District and wrote that it is a "sort of national property in which every man has a right and interest who has an eye to perceive and a heart to enjoy".

The origins of the environmental movement lay in response to increasing levels of smoke pollution in the atmosphere during the Industrial Revolution. The emergence of great factories and the concomitant immense growth in coal consumption gave rise to an unprecedented level of air pollution in industrial centers; after 1900 the large volume of industrial chemical discharges added to the growing load of untreated human waste. Under increasing political pressure from the urban middle-class, the first large-scale, modern environmental laws came in the form of Britain's Alkali Acts, passed in 1863, to regulate the deleterious air pollution (gaseous hydrochloric acid) given off by the Leblanc process, used to produce soda ash.

Conservation movement

The modern conservation movement was first manifested in the forests of India, with the practical application of scientific conservation principles. The conservation ethic that began to evolve included three core principles: that the human activity damaged the environment, that there was a civic duty to maintain the environment for future generations, and that scientific, empirically based methods should be applied to ensure this duty was carried out. James Ranald Martin was prominent in promoting this ideology, publishing many medico-topographical reports that demonstrated the scale of damage wrought through large-scale deforestation and desiccation, and lobbying extensively for the institutionalization of forest conservation activities in British India through the establishment of Forest Departments.

The Madras Board of Revenue started local conservation efforts in 1842, headed by Alexander Gibson, a professional botanist who systematically adopted a forest conservation programme based on scientific principles. This was the first case of state management of forests in the world. Eventually, the government under Governor-General Lord Dalhousie introduced the first permanent and large-scale forest conservation programme in the world in 1855, a model that soon spread to other colonies, as well as the United States. In 1860, the Department banned the use of shifting cultivation. Hugh Cleghorn's 1861 manual, The forests and gardens of South India, became the definitive work on the subject and was widely used by forest assistants in the subcontinent.

Dietrich Brandis joined the British service in 1856 as superintendent of the teak forests of Pegu division in eastern Burma. During that time Burma's teak forests were controlled by militant Karen tribals. He introduced the "taungya" system, in which Karen villagers provided labour for clearing, planting, and weeding teak plantations. He formulated new forest legislation and helped establish research and training institutions. The Imperial Forestry School at Dehradun was founded by him.

Formation of environmental protection societies
The late 19th century saw the formation of the first wildlife conservation societies.
The zoologist Alfred Newton published a series of investigations into the Desirability of establishing a 'Close-time' for the preservation of indigenous animals between 1872 and 1903. His advocacy for legislation to protect animals from hunting during the mating season led to the formation of the Plumage League (later the Royal Society for the Protection of Birds) in 1889. The society acted as a protest group campaigning against the use of great crested grebe and kittiwake skins and feathers in fur clothing. The Society attracted growing support from the suburban middle-classes, and influenced the passage of the Sea Birds Preservation Act in 1869 as the first nature protection law in the world.

For most of the century from 1850 to 1950, however, the primary environmental cause was the mitigation of air pollution. The Coal Smoke Abatement Society was formed in 1898 making it one of the oldest environmental NGOs. It was founded by artist Sir William Blake Richmond, frustrated with the pall cast by coal smoke. Although there were earlier pieces of legislation, the Public Health Act 1875 required all furnaces and fireplaces to consume their own smoke.

Systematic and general efforts on behalf of the environment only began in the late 19th century; it grew out of the amenity movement in Britain in the 1870s, which was a reaction to industrialization, the growth of cities, and worsening air and water pollution. Starting with the formation of the Commons Preservation Society in 1865, the movement championed rural preservation against the encroachments of industrialisation. Robert Hunter, solicitor for the society, worked with Hardwicke Rawnsley, Octavia Hill, and John Ruskin to lead a successful campaign to prevent the construction of railways to carry slate from the quarries, which would have ruined the unspoilt valleys of Newlands and Ennerdale. This success led to the formation of the Lake District Defence Society (later to become The Friends of the Lake District).

In 1893 Hill, Hunter and Rawnsley agreed to set up a national body to coordinate environmental conservation efforts across the country; the "National Trust for Places of Historic Interest or Natural Beauty" was formally inaugurated in 1894. The organisation obtained secure footing through the 1907 National Trust Bill, which gave the trust the status of a statutory corporation. and the bill was passed in August 1907.

An early "Back-to-Nature" movement, which anticipated the romantic ideal of modern environmentalism, was advocated by intellectuals such as John Ruskin, William Morris, and Edward Carpenter, who were all against consumerism, pollution and other activities that were harmful to the natural world. The movement was a reaction to the urban conditions of the industrial towns, where sanitation was awful, pollution levels intolerable and housing terribly cramped. Idealists championed the rural life as a mythical Utopia and advocated a return to it. John Ruskin argued that people should return to a "small piece of English ground, beautiful, peaceful, and fruitful. We will have no steam engines upon it ... we will have plenty of flowers and vegetables ... we will have some music and poetry; the children will learn to dance to it and sing it."

Practical ventures in the establishment of small cooperative farms were even attempted and old rural traditions, without the "taint of manufacture or the canker of artificiality", were enthusiastically revived, including the Morris dance and the maypole.

The movement in the United States began in the late 19th century, out of concerns for protecting the natural resources of the West, with individuals such as John Muir and Henry David Thoreau making key philosophical contributions. Thoreau was interested in peoples' relationship with nature and studied this by living close to nature in a simple life. He published his experiences in the book Walden, which argues that people should become intimately close with nature. Muir came to believe in nature's inherent right, especially after spending time hiking in Yosemite Valley and studying both the ecology and geology. He successfully lobbied congress to form Yosemite National Park and went on to set up the Sierra Club in 1892. The conservationist principles as well as the belief in an inherent right of nature were to become the bedrock of modern environmentalism. However, the early movement in the U.S. developed with a contradiction; preservationists like John Muir wanted land and nature set aside for its own sake, and conservationists, such as Gifford Pinchot (appointed as the first Chief of the US Forest Service from 1905 to 1910), wanted to manage natural resources for human use.

20th century
In the 20th century, environmental ideas continued to grow in popularity and recognition. Efforts were beginning to be made to save the wildlife, particularly the American bison. The death of the last passenger pigeon as well as the endangerment of the American bison helped to focus the minds of conservationists and popularize their concerns. In 1916, the National Park Service was founded by U.S. President Woodrow Wilson. Pioneers of the movement called for more efficient and professional management of natural resources. They fought for reform because they believed the destruction of forests, fertile soil, minerals, wildlife, and water resources would lead to the downfall of society. The group that has been the most active in recent years is the climate movement.

The U.S movement began to take off after World War II, as people began to recognize the costs of environmental negligence, disease, and the expansion of air and water pollution through the occurrence of several environmental disasters that occurred post-World War II. Aldo Leopold published A Sand County Almanac in 1949. He believed in a land ethic that recognized that maintaining the "beauty, integrity, and health of natural systems" as a moral and ethical imperative.

Another major literary force in the promotion of the environmental movement was Rachel Carson's 1962 book Silent Spring about declining bird populations due to DDT, an insecticide, pollutant, and man's attempts to control nature through the use of synthetic substances. Her core message for her readers was to identify the complex and fragile ecosystem and the threats facing the population. In 1958, Carson started to work on her last book, with an idea that nature needs human protection. Her influence was radioactive fallout, smog, food additives, and pesticide use. Carson's main focus was on pesticides, which led her to identify nature as fragile and the use of technology dangerous to humans and other species.

Both of these books helped bring the issues into the public eye Rachel Carson's Silent Spring sold over two million copies and is linked to a nationwide ban on DDT and the creation of the EPA.

Beginning in 1969 and continuing into the 1970s, Illinois-based environmental activist James F. Phillips engaged in numerous covert anti-pollution campaigns using the pseudonym "the Fox." His activities included plugging illegal sewage outfall pipes and dumping toxic wastewater produced by a US Steel factory inside the company's Chicago corporate office. Phillips' "ecotage" campaigns attracted considerable media attention and subsequently inspired other direct action protests against environmental destruction.

The first Earth Day was celebrated on 22 April 1970. Its founder, former Wisconsin Senator Gaylord Nelson, was inspired to create this day of environmental education and awareness after seeing the oil spill off the coast of Santa Barbara in 1969. Greenpeace was created in 1971 as an organization that believed that political advocacy and legislation were ineffective or inefficient solutions and supported non-violent action. 1980 saw the creation of Earth First!, a group with an ecocentric view of the world – believing in equality between the rights of humans to flourish, the rights of all other species to flourish and the rights of life-sustaining systems to flourish.

In the 1950s, 1960s, and 1970s, several events illustrated the magnitude of environmental damage caused by humans. In 1954, a hydrogen bomb test at Bikini Atoll exposed the 23-man crew of the Japanese fishing vessel Lucky Dragon 5 to radioactive fallout. The incident is known as Castle Bravo, the largest thermonuclear device ever detonated by the United States and the first in a series of high-yield thermonuclear weapon design tests. In 1967 the oil tanker  ran aground off the coast of Cornwall, and in 1969 oil spilled from an offshore well in California's Santa Barbara Channel. In 1971, the conclusion of a lawsuit in Japan drew international attention to the effects of decades of mercury poisoning on the people of Minamata.

At the same time, emerging scientific research drew new attention to existing and hypothetical threats to the environment and humanity. Among them were Paul R. Ehrlich, whose book The Population Bomb (1968) revived Malthusian concerns about the impact of exponential population growth. Biologist Barry Commoner generated a debate about growth, affluence and "flawed technology." Additionally, an association of scientists and political leaders known as the Club of Rome published their report The Limits to Growth in 1972, and drew attention to the growing pressure on natural resources from human activities.

Meanwhile, technological accomplishments such as nuclear proliferation and photos of the Earth from outer space provided both new insights and new reasons for concern over Earth's seemingly small and unique place in the universe.

In 1972, the United Nations Conference on the Human Environment was held in Stockholm, and for the first time united the representatives of multiple governments in discussion relating to the state of the global environment. This conference led directly to the creation of government environmental agencies and the UN Environment Program.

By the mid-1970s anti-nuclear activism had moved beyond local protests and politics to gain a wider appeal and influence.  Although it lacked a single co-ordinating organization the anti-nuclear movement's efforts gained a great deal of attention, especially in the United Kingdom and United States. In the aftermath of the Three Mile Island accident in 1979, many mass demonstrations took place. The largest one was held in New York City in September 1979 and involved 200,000 people.

Since the 1970s, public awareness, environmental sciences, ecology, and technology have advanced to include modern focus points like ozone depletion, global climate change, acid rain, mutation breeding, genetically modified crops and genetically modified livestock. With mutation breeding, crop cultivars were created by exposing seeds to chemicals or radiation. Many of these cultivars are still being used today. Genetically modified plants and animals are said by some environmentalists to be inherently bad because they are unnatural. Others point out the possible benefits of GM crops such as water conservation through corn modified to be less "thirsty" and decreased pesticide use through insect – resistant crops. They also point out that some genetically modified livestock have accelerated growth which means there are shorter production cycles which again results in a more efficient use of feed.
Besides genetically modified crops and livestock, synthetic biology is also on the rise and environmentalists argue that these also contain risks, if these organisms were ever to end up in nature. This, as unlike with genetically modified organisms, synthetic biology even uses base pairs that do not exist in nature.

21st century
In 2022, Global Witness reported that, in the preceding decade, more than 1,700 land and environmental defenders were killed, about one every two days. Brazil, Colombia, Philippines, and Mexico were the deadliest countries.

United States

Beginning in the conservation movement at the beginning of the 20th century, the contemporary environmental movement's roots can be traced back to Rachel Carson's 1962 book Silent Spring, Murray Bookchin's 1962 book Our Synthetic Environment, and Paul R. Ehrlich's 1968 The Population Bomb. American environmentalists have campaigned against nuclear weapons and nuclear power in the 1960s and 1970s, acid rain in the 1980s, ozone depletion and deforestation in the 1990s, and most recently climate change and global warming.

The United States passed many pieces of environmental legislation in the 1970s, such as the Clean Water Act, the Clean Air Act, the Endangered Species Act, and the National Environmental Policy Act. These remain as the foundations for current environmental standards.

Timeline of US environmental history
1832 – Hot Springs Reservation
1864 – Yosemite Valley
1872 – Yellowstone National Park
1892 – Sierra Club
1916 – National Park Service Organic Act
1916 – National Audubon Society
1949 – UN Scientific Conference on the Conservation and Utilization of Resources
1961 – World Wildlife Foundation
1964 – Land and Water Conservation Act
1964 – National Wilderness Preservation System
1968 – National Trails System Act
1968 – National Wild and Scenic Rivers System/Wild and Scenic Rivers Act
1969 – National Environmental Policy Act
1970 – First Earth Day- 22 April
1970 – Clean Air Act
1970 – Environmental Protection Agency
1971 – Greenpeace
1972 – Clean Water Act
1973 – Endangered Species Act
1980 – Earth First!
1992 – UN Earth Summit in Rio de Janeiro
1997 – Kyoto Protocol commits state parties to reduce greenhouse gas emissions
2017 –  First National CleanUp Day

Latin America

After the International Environmental Conference in Stockholm in 1972 Latin American officials returned with a high hope of growth and protection of the fairly untouched natural resources. Governments spent millions of dollars, and created departments and pollution standards. However, the outcomes have not always been what officials had initially hoped. Activists blame this on growing urban populations and industrial growth. Many Latin American countries have had a large inflow of immigrants that are living in substandard housing. Enforcement of the pollution standards is lax and penalties are minimal; in Venezuela, the largest penalty for violating an environmental law is 50,000 bolivar fine ($3,400) and three days in jail. In the 1970s or 1980s, many Latin American countries were transitioning from military dictatorships to democratic governments.

Brazil

In 1992, Brazil came under scrutiny with the United Nations Conference on Environment and Development in Rio de Janeiro. Brazil has a history of little environmental awareness. It has the highest biodiversity in the world and also the highest amount of habitat destruction. One-third of the world's forests lie in Brazil. It is home to the largest river, The Amazon, and the largest rainforest, the Amazon Rainforest. People have raised funds to create state parks and increase the consciousness of people who have destroyed forests and polluted waterways. It is home to several organizations that have fronted the environmental movement. The Blue Wave Foundation was created in 1989 and has partnered with advertising companies to promote national education campaigns to keep Brazil's beaches clean. Funatura was created in 1986 and is a wildlife sanctuary program. Pro-Natura International is a private environmental organization created in 1986.

Europe

In 1952 the Great London Smog episode killed thousands of people and led the UK to create the first Clean Air Act in 1956. In 1957 the first major nuclear accident occurred in Windscale in northern England. The supertanker Torrey Canyon ran aground off the coast of Cornwall in 1967, causing the first major oil leak that killed marine life along the coast. In 1972, in Stockholm, the United Nations Conference on the Human Environment created the UN Environment Programme. The EU's environmental policy was formally founded by a European Council declaration and the first five-year environment programme was adopted. The main idea of the declaration was that prevention is better than the cure and the polluter should pay.

In the 1980s the green parties that were created a decade before began to have some political success. In 1986, there was a nuclear accident in Chernobyl, Ukraine. A large-scale environmental campaign was staged in Ukraine in 1986. The end of the 1980s and start of the 1990s saw the fall of communism across central and Eastern Europe, the fall of the Berlin Wall, and the Union of East and West Germany. In 1992 there was a UN summit held in Rio de Janeiro where Agenda 21 was adopted. The Kyoto Protocol was created in 1997, setting specific targets and deadlines to reduce global greenhouse gas emissions. The Kyoto Protocol has 192 signatories, including the European Union, Cook Islands, Niue, and all UN member states except Andorra, Canada, South Sudan, and the United States. In the early 2000s, activists believed that environmental policy concerns were overshadowed by energy security, globalism, and terrorism.

Asia

Middle East
The environmental movement is reaching the less developed world with different degrees of success. The Arab world, including the Middle East and North Africa, has different adaptations of the environmental movement. Countries on the Persian Gulf have high incomes and rely heavily on the large amount of energy resources in the area. Each country in the Arab world has varying combinations of low or high amounts of natural resources and low or high amounts of labor.

The League of Arab States has one specialized sub-committee, of 12 standing specialized subcommittees in the Foreign Affairs Ministerial Committees, which deals with Environmental Issues. Countries in the League of Arab States have demonstrated an interest in environmental issues, on paper some environmental activists have doubts about the level of commitment to environmental issues; being a part of the world community may have obliged these countries to portray concern for the environment. The initial level of environmental awareness may be the creation of a ministry of the environment. The year of establishment of a ministry is also indicative of the level of engagement. Saudi Arabia was the first to establish environmental law in 1992 followed by Egypt in 1994. Somalia is the only country without environmental law. In 2010 the Environmental Performance Index listed Algeria as the top Arab country at 42 of 163; Morocco was at 52 and Syria at 56. The Environmental Performance Index measures the ability of a country to actively manage and protect its environment and the health of its citizens. A weighted index is created by giving 50% weight for environmental health objective (health) and 50% for ecosystem vitality (ecosystem); values range from 0–100. No Arab countries were in the top quartile, and 7 countries were in the lowest quartile.

South Korea and Taiwan
South Korea and Taiwan experienced similar growth in industrialization from 1965 to 1990 with few environmental controls. South Korea's Han River and Nakdong River were so polluted by unchecked dumping of industrial waste that they were close to being classified as biologically dead. Taiwan's formula for balanced growth was to prevent industrial concentration and encourage manufacturers to set up in the countryside. This led to 20% of the farmland being polluted by industrial waste and 30% of the rice grown on the island was contaminated with heavy metals. Both countries had spontaneous environmental movements drawing participants from different classes. Their demands were linked with issues of employment, occupational health, and agricultural crisis. They were also quite militant; the people learned that protesting can bring results. The polluting factories were forced to make immediate improvements to the conditions or pay compensation to victims. Some were even forced to shut down or move locations. The people were able to force the government to come out with new restrictive rules on toxins, industrial waste, and air pollution. All of these new regulations caused the migration of those polluting industries from Taiwan and South Korea to China and other countries in Southeast Asia with more relaxed environmental laws.

China

China's environmental movement is characterized by the rise of environmental NGOs, policy advocacy, spontaneous alliances, and protests that often only occur at the local level. Environmental protests in China are increasingly expanding their scope of concerns, calling for broader participation "in the name of the public."

The Chinese have realized the ability of riots and protests to have success and had led to an increase in disputes in China by 30% since 2005 to more than 50,000 events. Protests cover topics such as environmental issues, land loss, income, and political issues. They have also grown in size from about 10 people or fewer in the mid-1990s to 52 people per incident in 2004. China has more relaxed environmental laws than other countries in Asia, so many polluting factories have relocated to China, causing pollution in China.

Water pollution, water scarcity, soil pollution, soil degradation, and desertification are issues currently in discussion in China. The groundwater table of the North China Plain is dropping by 1.5 m (5 ft) per year. This groundwater table occurs in the region of China that produces 40% of the country's grain. The Center for Legal Assistance to Pollution Victims works to confront legal issues associated with environmental justice by hearing court cases that expose the narratives of victims of environmental pollution.  As China continues domestic economic reforms and integration into global markets, there emerge new linkages between China's domestic environmental degradation and global ecological crisis.

Comparing the experience of China, South Korea, Japan and Taiwan reveals that the impact of environmental activism is heavily modified by domestic political context, particularly the level of integration of mass-based protests and policy advocacy NGOs. Hinted by the history of neighboring Japan and South Korea, the possible convergence of NGOs and anti-pollution protests will have significant implications for Chinese environmental politics in the coming years.

India

Environmental and public health is an ongoing struggle within India. The first seed of an environmental movement in India was the foundation in 1964 of Dasholi Gram Swarajya Sangh, a labour cooperative started by Chandi Prasad Bhatt. It was inaugurated by Sucheta Kriplani and founded on land donated by Shyma Devi. This initiative was eventually followed up with the Chipko movement starting in 1974.

The most severe single event underpinning the movement was the Bhopal gas leakage on 3 December 1984. 40 tons of methyl isocyanate was released, immediately killing 2,259 people and ultimately affecting 700,000 citizens.

India has a national campaign against Coca-Cola and Pepsi Cola plants due to their practices of drawing groundwater and contaminating fields with sludge. The movement is characterized by local struggles against intensive aquaculture farms. The most influential part of the environmental movement in India is the anti-dam movement. Dam creation has been thought of as a way for India to catch up with the West by connecting to the power grid with giant dams, coal or oil-powered plants, or nuclear plants. Jhola Aandolan a mass movement is conducting as fighting against polyethylene carry bags uses and promoting cloth/jute/paper carry bags to protect the environment and nature. Activists in the Indian environmental movement consider global warming, sea levels rising, and glaciers retreating decreasing the amount of water flowing into streams to be the biggest challenges for them to face in the early twenty-first century.
Eco Revolution movement has been started by Eco Needs Foundation in 2008 from Aurangabad Maharashtra that seeks the participation of children, youth, researchers, spiritual and political leaders to organise awareness programmes and conferences. Child activists against air pollution in India and greenhouse gas emissions by India include Licypriya Kangujam.

Bangladesh
Mithun Roy Chowdhury, President, Save Nature & Wildlife (SNW), Bangladesh, insisted that the people of Bangladesh raise their voice against Tipaimukh Dam, being constructed by the Government of India. He said the Tipaimukh Dam project will be another "death trap for Bangladesh like the Farakka Barrage," which would lead to an environmental disaster for 50 million people in the Meghna River basin. He said that this project will start desertification in Bangladesh.

Africa

South Africa

Oceania

Australia

New Zealand

Scope of the movement

Environmental science is the study of the interactions among the physical, chemical, and biological components of the environment.

Ecology, or ecological science, is the scientific study of the distribution and abundance of living organisms and how these properties are affected by interactions between the organisms and their environment.

Primary focus points

The environmental movement is broad in scope and can include any topic related to the environment, conservation, and biology, as well as the preservation of landscapes, flora, and fauna for a variety of purposes and uses. See List of environmental issues. When an act of violence is committed against someone or some institution in the name of environmental defense it is referred to as eco-terrorism.

The conservation movement seeks to protect natural areas for sustainable consumption, as well as traditional (hunting, fishing, trapping) and spiritual use.
 Environmental conservation is the process in which one is involved in conserving the natural aspects of the environment. Whether through reforestation, recycling, or pollution control, environmental conservation sustains the natural quality of life.
 Environmental health movement dates at least to Progressive Era, and focuses on urban standards like clean water, efficient sewage handling, and stable population growth. Environmental health could also deal with nutrition, preventive medicine, aging, and other concerns specific to human well-being. Environmental health is also seen as an indicator for the state of the environment, or an early warning system for what may happen to humans
 Environmental justice is a movement that began in the U.S. in the 1980s and seeks an end to environmental racism and to prevent low-income and minority communities from an unbalanced exposure to highways, garbage dumps, and factories. The Environmental Justice movement seeks to link "social" and "ecological" environmental concerns, while at the same time preventing de facto racism, and classism. This makes it particularly adequate for the construction of labor-environmental alliances.
 Ecology movement could involve the Gaia Theory, as well as Value of Earth and other interactions between humans, science, and responsibility.
 Bright green environmentalism is a currently popular sub-movement, which emphasizes the idea that through technology, good design and more thoughtful use of energy and resources, people can live responsible, sustainable lives while enjoying prosperity.
 Light green, and dark green environmentalism are yet other sub-movements, respectively distinguished by seeing environmentalism as a lifestyle choice (light greens), and promoting reduction in human numbers and/or a relinquishment of technology (dark greens)
 Deep Ecology is an ideological spinoff of the ecology movement that views the diversity and integrity of the planetary ecosystem, in and for itself, as its primary value.
 The anti-nuclear movement opposes the use of various nuclear technologies. The initial anti-nuclear objective was nuclear disarmament and later the focus began to shift to other issues, mainly opposition to the use of nuclear power. There have been many large anti-nuclear demonstrations and protests. Major anti-nuclear groups include Campaign for Nuclear Disarmament, Friends of the Earth, Greenpeace, International Physicians for the Prevention of Nuclear War, and the Nuclear Information and Resource Service.
 The pro-nuclear movement consists of people, including former opponents of nuclear energy, who calculate that the threat to humanity from climate change is far worse than any risk associated with nuclear energy.

Environmental law and theory

Property rights
Many environmental lawsuits question the legal rights of property owners, and whether the general public has a right to intervene with detrimental practices occurring on someone else's land.  Environmental law organizations exist all across the world, such as the Environmental Law and Policy Center in the midwestern United States.

Citizens' rights
One of the earliest lawsuits to establish that citizens may sue for environmental and aesthetic harms was Scenic Hudson Preservation Conference v. Federal Power Commission, decided in 1965 by the Second Circuit Court of Appeals.  The case helped halt the construction of a power plant on Storm King Mountain in New York State.  See also United States environmental law and David Sive, an attorney who was involved in the case.

Nature's rights

Christopher D. Stone's 1972 essay, "Should trees have standing?" addressed the question of whether natural objects themselves should have legal rights. In the essay, Stone suggests that his argument is valid because many current rightsholders (women, children) were once seen as objects.

Environmental reactivism
Numerous criticisms and ethical ambiguities have led to growing concerns about technology, including the use of potentially harmful pesticides, water additives like fluoride, and the extremely dangerous ethanol-processing plants.

When residents living near proposed developments organize opposition they are sometimes called "NIMBYS", short for "not in my back yard".

Environmentalism today

Today, the sciences of ecology and environmental science, in addition to any aesthetic goals, provide the basis of unity to some of the serious environmentalists. As more information is gathered in scientific fields, more scientific issues like biodiversity, as opposed to mere aesthetics, are a concern to environmentalists. Conservation biology is a rapidly developing field.

In recent years, the environmental movement has increasingly focused on global warming as one of the top issues. As concerns about climate change moved more into the mainstream, from the connections drawn between global warming and Hurricane Katrina to Al Gore's 2006 documentary film An Inconvenient Truth, more and more environmental groups refocused their efforts. In the United States, 2007 witnessed the largest grassroots environmental demonstration in years, Step It Up 2007, with rallies in over 1,400 communities and all 50 states for real global warming solutions.

Publicity and widespread organising of school strike for the climate began after Swedish schoolgirl Greta Thunberg staged a protest in August 2018 outside the Swedish Riksdag (parliament). The September 2019 climate strikes were likely the largest climate strikes in world history.

In 2019, a survey found that climate breakdown is viewed as the most important issue facing the world in seven out of the eight countries surveyed.

Many religious organizations and individual churches now have programs and activities dedicated to environmental issues. The religious movement is often supported by interpretation of scriptures. Most major religious groups are represented including Jewish, Islamic, Anglican, Orthodox, Evangelical, Zoroastrian, Christian and Catholic.

Radical environmentalism

Radical environmentalism emerged from an ecocentrism-based frustration with the co-option of mainstream environmentalism. The radical environmental movement aspires to what scholar Christopher Manes calls "a new kind of environmental activism: iconoclastic, uncompromising, discontented with traditional conservation policy, at times illegal ..." Radical environmentalism presupposes a need to reconsider Western ideas of religion and philosophy (including capitalism, patriarchy and globalization) sometimes through "resacralising" and reconnecting with nature.
Greenpeace represents an organization with a radical approach, but has contributed in serious ways towards understanding of critical issues, and has a science-oriented core with radicalism as a means to media exposure. Groups like Earth First! take a much more radical posture. Some radical environmentalist groups, like Earth First! and the Earth Liberation Front, illegally sabotage or destroy infrastructural capital.

Criticisms

Conservative critics of the movement characterize it as radical and misguided. Especially critics of the United States Endangered Species Act, which has come under scrutiny lately, and the Clean Air Act, which they said conflict with private property rights, corporate profits and the nation's overall economic growth. Critics also challenge the scientific evidence for global warming. They argue that the environmental movement has diverted attention from more pressing issues. Western environmental activists have also been criticized for performative activism, eco-colonialism, and enacting white savior tropes, especially celebrities who promote conservation in developing countries.

See also

 AI and Environment
 Anti-consumerism
 Chemical Leasing
 Carbon Neutrality
 Car-free movement
 Earth Science
 Earth Strike
 Eco-anarchism
 Eco-socialism
 Ecofascism
 Ecological economics
 Ecological modernization
 Ecopsychology
 Environmental justice
 Environmental philosophy
 Environmental organizations
 Family planning
 Free-market environmentalism
 Green anarchism
 Green movement
 Green seniors
 Green syndicalism
 Holistic management
 National Cleanup Day
 Natural environment
 Political ecology
 Positive environmentalism
 Sexecology
 Social ecology
 Substitute good
 Sustainability
 Sustainability and systemic change resistance
 Technogaianism
 Timeline of environmental events
 Voluntary Human Extinction Movement
 List of women climate scientists and activists

References

Further reading
 Brinkley, Douglas. Silent Spring Revolution: John F. Kennedy, Rachel Carson, Lyndon Johnson, Richard Nixon, and the Great Environmental Awakening (2022) excerpt

Guha, Ramachandra. 1999. Environmentalism: A Global History, London, Longman.
Hawken, Paul. 2007. Blessed Unrest, Penguin.
 Kamieniecki, Sheldon, ed. 1993. Environmental Politics in the International Arena: Movements, Parties, Organizations, and Policy, Albany: State University of New York Press, 
 Kline, Benjamin. First Along the River: A brief history of the U.S. environmental movement (4th ed. 2011)
 McCormick, John. 1995. The Global Environmental Movement, London: John Wiley.
 Shabecoff, Philip. 2003. A Fierce Green Fire: The American Environmental Movement, Island Press; Revised Edition, 
 
 Wapner, Paul. 1996. Environmental Activism and World Civil Politics, Albany: State University of New York, 

Environmental movements
Environmentalism
Movement